Wümme is a river in northern Germany, in the states Lower Saxony and Bremen, marking the border between the two states for part of its course. It is the main headstream of the Lesum.

The river's source is on the Wulfsberg in Lüneburg Heath. West of Rotenburg, it takes up the rivers Rodau and Wiedau. The Wümme from the left and the Hamme from the right combine near Wasserhorst (part of Blockland in Bremen) forming the Lesum.

Towns on the river Wümme are Lauenbrück, Scheeßel, Rotenburg, Ottersberg, Fischerhude, Lilienthal and Bremen.

See also
List of rivers of Bremen
List of rivers of Lower Saxony

References

Rivers of Bremen (state)
Rivers of Lower Saxony
Federal waterways in Germany
Rivers of Germany